Raktabhishekam is a 1988 Indian Telugu-language action film based on Yandamuri Veerendranath's acclaimed novel of the same title. The film stars Nandamuri Balakrishna as Parthasarathi opposite Radha who enacted the female lead, Aparna. Ilayaraja composed the film's score and soundtrack. The film directed by A. Kodandarami Reddy was released on 9 December 1988. The film was dubbed into Tamil as Rathabhishegam.

Plot
The film begins with a hazardous netherworld Black Tigers who creates mayhem in the country led by its deputy chief Black Cheetah Prasad. Anyhow, its chieftain Black Panther is under a veil. Pardhasaradhi a lionhearted has a merry family his father Constable Narasimham, brother Inspector Bhargav, sister-in-law Kamala & their cutesiest daughter Raaji. Currently, Narasimham receives a Presidential Award for his integrity. On that occasion DIG Raj Gopal, a heartfelt cop organizes a ceremony in his honor. Whereat, Pardhasaradhi garlands Raj Gopal and assassinates him by removing the revolver from it. Speedily, he flees and reaches his love Aparna who surrenders him to the police. Astonishingly, she is the daughter of Raj Gopal but Pardhasaradhi succeeds in absconding twice. 

The next day, its mourning fraternity of Raj Gopal where GS Rao a humanitarian afflicted by black tigers conveys his condolences. Consequently, Pardhasaradhi abducts Aparna and Bhargav chases him when he seizes the two and spins rearward. Pardhasaradhi spends his life cheerfully one time he squabbles with Aparna. After a series of donnybrooks, they crush. Meanwhile, black tigers design a bank robbery when Pardhasaradhi obstructs them and catch hold of one whom Bhargav severely interrogates. To slay him Prasad contacts Narasimham when he uncovers the Blank Panther when they show endanger to Raaji to shut him. Following this, they intrigue and ruin their sign by designing a sidekick as police on behalf of Bhargav. This day, GS Rao conducts an agitation against the cruelty of Bhargav which he is unable to withstand and attempts suicide. So, to guard him Narasimham heat for this when Pardhasaradhi pledges to prove his father as non-guilty and break out of the mystery of the Black Panther. 

Accordingly, he brings truth to light with the aid of Aparna and acquits Narasimham. Since Pardhasaradhi turns into diehard Prasad tricks by disguising a black tiger as an I.G. and falsifying it as a scheme to snare Black Tigers and get Raj Gopal killed via him. Despite verity, Bhargav decides to apprehend Pardhasaradhi but Aparna trusts him and they run off. As it is inevitable, Bhargav announces his father's death to seize Pardhasaradhi. Thus, he is out of hiding together with black tigers awaiting to attack when Narasimham dies. Before leaving breathing as a flabbergast, he unwraps that Black Panther is non-else GS Rao. At a stretch, Pardhasaradhi finds the headquarters of diabolic when tragically, his remaining family is massacred. At last, he flares up and razes barbarians. Finally, the movie ends with Pardhasaradhi surrendering before the judiciary.

Cast

Nandamuri Balakrishna as Parthasarathi
Radha as Aparna
Satyanarayana as Black panther / GS Rao
Jaggayya as D.I.G. Raj Gopal
Sarath Babu as Inspector Bhargava
Ranganath as Black Cheetah / Prasad
J. V. Somayajulu as Constable Narasimham
Vankayala Satyanarayana 
Bhimiswara Rao 
CH Krishna Murthy 
Brahmanandam 
Suthi Velu 
Chitti Babu
Sangeetha as Kamala
Sri Lakshmi 
Shobha 
Mamatha as Principal 
Baby Sujitha as Raaji

Soundtrack

Music composed by Ilaiyaraaja. Lyrics written by Veturi. Music released on Echo Music Company.

References

External links
Raktabhishekam at Gaana

1988 films
1980s Telugu-language films
Films directed by A. Kodandarami Reddy
Films scored by Ilaiyaraaja
Films based on novels by Yandamuri Veerendranath